Ward 10 Spadina—Fort York is a municipal electoral division in Toronto, Ontario that has been represented in the Toronto City Council since the 2018 municipal election. It was last contested in 2022, with Ausma Malik elected councillor for the 2022–2026 term.

History 
The ward was created in 2018 when the provincial government aligned Toronto's then-44 municipal wards with the 25 corresponding provincial and federal ridings. The current ward is made up of the southern parts of the old Ward 19 Trinity—Spadina, Ward 20 Trinity—Spadina, Ward 27 Toronto Centre—Rosedale and Ward 28 Toronto Centre—Rosedale.

2018 municipal election 
Ward 10 Spadina—Fort York was first contested during the 2018 municipal election with 14 candidates. Joe Cressy was ultimately elected with 55.06 per cent of the vote.

Geography 
Ward 10 is part of the Toronto and East York community council.

Spadina—Fort York's west boundary is Winona Drive, Ossington Avenue, Dundas Street and Davenport Road, and the east boundary is the Don River and the Port Lands neighbourhood. The north boundary is Dundas Street, Bay Street and The Esplanade, and the south boundary is Lake Ontario. The ward also comprises the Toronto Islands.

Councillors

Election results

See also 

 Municipal elections in Canada
 Municipal government of Toronto
 List of Toronto municipal elections

References

External links 

 Councillor's webpage

Toronto city council wards
2018 establishments in Ontario